Crimson Rivers II: Angels of the Apocalypse (French: Les Rivières pourpres II: Les Anges de l'apocalypse) is a 2004 action thriller film movie starring Jean Reno, Benoît Magimel, and Christopher Lee. It is directed by Olivier Dahan and produced by Ilan Goldman. It is the sequel to the 2000 film The Crimson Rivers (French: Les Rivières pourpres).  However, the 2000 film's creator Jean-Christophe Grangé wasn't creatively-involved in the sequel; instead, the movie was written by Luc Besson, whose company EuropaCorp also co-produced this movie.

Plot
After a body is found in the walls of a French monastery, Commissaire Niemans, played by Jean Reno, teams up with Detective Reda, played by Benoît Magimel, who is already investigating a murder of his own. As with the first movie, the pair's investigations intertwine and soon they are looking at a giant conspiracy involving a secretive group of monks on amphetamines led by Heinrich von Garten, played by Christopher Lee, searching for a treasure hidden by King Lothair II somewhere near the Maginot-Line. Reno and Magimel are joined by a religious specialist called Marie, played by Camille Natta.

Cast
 Jean Reno – Commissaire Niemans
 Benoît Magimel – Capitaine Reda
 Christopher Lee – Heinrich von Garten
 Camille Natta – Marie
 Serge Riaboukine – Father Vincent
 Gabrielle Lazure – Philippe's wife
 Augustin Legrand – Jésus
 Johnny Hallyday – The blind hermit
 Michaël Abiteboul and Eriq Ebouaney – The cops

References

External links

 
 

2000s supernatural thriller films
2004 films
French supernatural thriller films
French detective films
French sequel films
French police films
Films directed by Olivier Dahan
Parkour in film
French action thriller films
Films scored by Colin Towns
Police detective films
2000s French films